Gehenna, also known as Through Hell or  Anguish is a 1938 Polish melodrama film directed by Michał Waszyński.

Cast
Lidia Wysocka...  Ania Tarłówna 
Witold Zacharewicz ...  Prince Andrzej Olelkowicz 
Bogusław Samborski ...  Uncle Kościesza 
Ina Benita...  Lorka, Ania's cousin 
Wlodzimierz Lozinski ...  Jaś, Ania's cousin 
Antoni Fertner ...  The Veterinarian 
Mieczysława Ćwiklińska ...  Ewelina, the housekeeper 
Józef Orwid ...  Grzegorz, the gamekeeper 
Jerzy Woskowski ...  The lame tramp 
Stanisława Wysocka ...  Ksenobia - the prince's nanny
Seweryna Broniszówna ...  Gypsy fortune teller 
Tadeusz Wesolowski ...  Okszta, the pilot 
Tamara Paslawska ...  The Gypsy queen 
Wanda Jakubinska ...  Ania's mother
Stefan Hnydziński ...  The prince's manservant

External links 
 

1938 films
1930s Polish-language films
Polish black-and-white films
Films directed by Michał Waszyński
1938 drama films
Films based on Polish novels
Polish romantic drama films
1938 romantic drama films
Melodrama films